Les Jones may refer to:

Les Jones (footballer, born 1905), Australian rules footballer for Hawthorn
Les Jones (footballer, born 1907), Australian rules footballer for North Melbourne
Les Jones (footballer, born April 1910), Australian rules footballer for St Kilda
Les Jones (footballer, born February 1910), Australian rules footballer for Melbourne
Les Jones (footballer, born 1922), Australian rules footballer for Richmond
Les Jones (footballer, born 1940), Welsh football (soccer) player for Tranmere Rovers
Les Jones (footballer, born 1930), Welsh football (soccer) player for Luton Town
Les Jones (Welsh footballer) (1922–1983), Welsh footballer
Les Jones (rugby league, born 1948), English rugby league footballer who played in the 1960s, 1970s and 1980s
Les Jones (rugby league, born c. 1920), rugby league footballer who played in the 1930s, 1940s and 1950s

See also
Leslie Jones (disambiguation)